Alessandro Gozzi (born 12 April 1993) is an Italian footballer.

Biography
Born in Pinerolo, in the Province of Turin, Piedmont, Gozzi was a player for Pro Vercelli. He played in 2010–11 reserve league. In summer 2011 he left for Serie D club Chieri. In summer 2012 Gozzi joined the fourth division club Savona. On 28 August 2013 Gozzi was signed by Parma F.C. He immediately left for Greek club Zakynthos along with Mauro Cerquetani.

On 31 January 2014 Gozzi was signed by Gubbio along with Bright Addae.

References

External links
 AIC profile (data by www.football.it) 

1993 births
People from Pinerolo
Footballers from Piedmont
Living people
Italian footballers
F.C. Pro Vercelli 1892 players
Savona F.B.C. players
Parma Calcio 1913 players
A.P.S. Zakynthos players
A.S. Gubbio 1910 players
Como 1907 players
A.C. Cuneo 1905 players
Serie C players
Serie D players
Association football goalkeepers
Italian expatriate footballers
Italian expatriate sportspeople in Greece
Expatriate footballers in Greece
Pinerolo F.C. players
Sportspeople from the Metropolitan City of Turin